Pasco County Public Transportation (or PCPT) provides public transportation in Pasco County, Florida. The agency operates both fixed bus and paratransit services.

Routes
PCPT operates ten fixed bus routes throughout Pasco County: three in East Pasco, six in West Pasco, and one weekday, cross-county service.

West County Routes:
14 Universal Plaza-Pasco–Hernando State College
16 Moon Lake - Pasco-Hernando State College
18 New Port Richey-Tarpon Springs
19 Bayonet Point-Tarpon Springs
20 Shady Hills
21 Scheer Commerce Center-Gulf View Square
23 Gulf View Sq. Mall-Universal Plaza
25 Chelsea Place -Gulf View Sq. Mall
East County Routes:
30 Trilby-Zephyrhills
31 Pasco–Hernando State College-Dade City-Clinton-Dade City
41 - Land O' Lakes
54 Universal Plaza, Medical Center of Trinity, Tampa Premium Outlets, Shops at Wiregrass, -Pasco–Hernando State College, The Grove - Zephyrhills City Hall

Connections to Pinellas Suncoast Transit Authority
Two PCPT bus routes, 18 and 19, provide connectivity with PSTA bus routes 19 and 66 respectively.

Connections to Hillsborough Area Regional Transit
PCPT bus route 54 connects with HART's commuter express line 275LX 

PCPT bus route 41 connects with HART's 20X

Connections to Hernando County's TheBus
PCPT bus Route 20 connects with TheBus's Blue Route, providing an additional connection to Hernando County;
PCPT bus route 21 connects with TheBus's (Hernando County, Florida) Purple Route 
Both Routes run on weekdays and Saturdays.

Fleet
25 foot Blue Bird (1997/1998/2002): 4/4/4
32 Foot Blue Bird (2002): 4
30 Foot Blue Bird (2003/7): 3/5
35 Foot Blue Bird (2006): 3

Expansion of Service
On March 5, 2012, a new weekday, cross-county route was added running along State Road 54. This service connects the east and west bus systems.

On October 5, 2020, a new weekday and Saturday route was added serving the Shady Hills area. Known as Route 20 Shady Hills

References

External links
Bus Routes
PCPT

Bus transportation in Florida
Transportation in Pasco County, Florida